Santos Air Force Base – BAST  is a base of the Brazilian Air Force, located in Guarujá, Brazil.

It will share some facilities with Guarujá Civil Metropolitan Aerodrome.

Units
Since January 2017 there are no permanent flying units assigned to Santos Air Force Base. Whenever needed, the aerodrome is used as a support facility to other air units of the Brazilian Air Force, Navy and Army.

Former Unit
1979–2006: 1st Squadron of the 11th Aviation Group (1º/11ºGAv) Gavião. The squadron was moved to Natal Air Force Base.

Accidents and incidents
13 August 2014: a private Cessna Citation Excel registration PR-AFA en route from Rio de Janeiro-Santos Dumont to Santos Air Force Base crashed while on final approach to Santos. All seven occupants died. Among the victims was Brazilian Socialist Party presidential candidate Eduardo Campos.

Access
The base is located 9 km from downtown Guarujá and 17 km from downtown Santos.

Gallery
This gallery displays aircraft that have been based at Santos. The gallery is not comprehensive.

See also
List of Brazilian military bases
Guarujá Civil Metropolitan Aerodrome

References

External links

São Paulo (state)
Brazilian Air Force
Brazilian Air Force bases
Buildings and structures in São Paulo (state)
Santos, São Paulo
Baixada Santista